Eric Patterson Jr. (February 5, 1993 – June 8, 2019) was an American football cornerback. He played college football for Ball State University, and was signed by the New England Patriots as an undrafted free agent in 2015. Patterson was also a member of the Indianapolis Colts, the St. Louis Rams and the Cleveland Browns

College
Patterson played college football for the Ball State Cardinals.

Professional career

New England Patriots
Patterson signed with the New England Patriots on May 8, 2015. He was released on June 9.

Indianapolis Colts
On August 9, 2015, Patterson signed with the Indianapolis Colts. He was released on September 5, and signed to the practice squad on September 6. Patterson was elevated to the active roster on September 18, and made his NFL debut against the New York Jets in Week 2, making 2 tackles. On September 22, Patterson was waived by the Colts, and re-signed to the practice squad the following day. He was waived from the practice squad on September 29.

St. Louis Rams
Patterson signed to the St. Louis Rams practice squad on October 2, 2015.

Cleveland Browns
On May 16, 2016, Patterson signed with the Cleveland Browns. On September 3, 2016, he was released by the Browns.

Death
Patterson was shot to death by a home intruder in his home in Tampa, Florida on June 8, 2019. A few days later, Tampa police released footage from the street outside the home showing vehicles suspected to have been driven by the shooter. , no arrests had been made.

References

External links
 Profile at BallStateSports.com

1993 births
2019 deaths
African-American players of American football
American football cornerbacks
Players of American football from Tampa, Florida
Ball State Cardinals football players
New England Patriots players
Indianapolis Colts players
St. Louis Rams players
Deaths by firearm in Florida
21st-century African-American sportspeople
Murdered African-American people
Henry B. Plant High School alumni
Unsolved murders in the United States